Dixon Springs may refer to:

Dixon Springs, Illinois
Dixon Springs, Tennessee
Dixon Springs State Park

See also
 Dixon (disambiguation)